Sturnira perla is a species of yellow-shouldered bat found in Ecuador.

Taxonomy and etymology
It was described as a new species in 2011 by Jarrín and Kunz. The holotype had been collected in Bosque Protector La Perla in 1990. Its species name "perla" was chosen both to refer to something "very precious" as well as the globular shape of its skull. Additionally, the species name honors Bosque Protector La Perla, which is where the majority of the specimens used in the original description were found.

Description
It is regarded as a cryptic species, as it is similar in appearance to the little, Louis's, and Tilda's yellow-shouldered bats.

Range and habitat
It is endemic to Ecuador.

Conservation
As of 2016, it is assessed as data deficient by the IUCN because it is poorly known, and, while it could be severely impacted by deforestation, it is also possible that its range could be larger than currently projected.

References

Bats of South America
Mammals described in 2011
Sturnira